Grace Chang (born 13 June 1933), known in Chinese as Ko Lan (葛蘭), is a Hong Kong-Chinese actress and singer. She was a popular idol in the 1950s, especially among students and the middle class.

She was a renowned Cathay Organization actress with many successes including It Blossoms Again, The Wild, Wild Rose, and Mambo Girl. Chang appeared in 33 films during her eleven-year acting career. Her last actual appearance was in 1964 though she has provided vocals for soundtracks.

Biography 
Chang was a Haining, Zhejiang native, born in Nanking and grew up in Shanghai. In 1949, Chang moved to Hong Kong with her father. The great singer-actress Chow Hsuan was her idol. 

Chang's stage name was Ko Lan, an approximation of her English name Grace. She began vocal training in her childhood.  Chang began her career with Taishan Pictures where she starred in her debut show, “Seven Sisters” in 1952. 

In 1961, Chang married Kao Fuchuan in London, England. Chang retired from acting in 1964.

Filmography
 1953 Seven Sisters
 1954 Red Bloom in the Snow 
 1954 Blood-Stained Flowers 
 1954 It Blossoms Again 
 1955 Soldier of Fortune
 1956 Surprise
 1956 The ingenious Seduction
 1956 The Long Lane
 1956 Over the Rolling Hills
 1956 The Story of a Fur Coat
 1957 Mambo Girl
 1957 Booze, Boobs and Bucks
 1957 Love and Crime 
 1957 Murder in the Night
 1958 Torrents of Desire
 1958 Golden Phoenix 
 Crimes of Passion (1959)
 Spring Song (1959)
 1959 Air Hostess - Lin Ke-Ping. in French.
 1959 Our Dream Car - Lee Jiaying.
 My Darling Sister (1959)
 The Girl With a Thousand Faces (1960)
 The June Bride (1960)
 1960 Forever Yours - Yu Liying.
 The Loving Couple (1960)
 Miss Pony-Tail (1960)
 The Wild, Wild Rose (1960)
 Sun, Moon and Star (1961)
 Sun, Moon and Star Part 2 (1961)
 Because of Her (1963)
 The Magic Lamp (1964)
 A Story of Three Loves Part 1 (1964)
 A Story of Three Loves Part 2 (1964)
 The Hole (1998) (soundtrack only)
 The Wayward Cloud (2005) (soundtrack only)
 Kala Malam Bulan Mengambang (2008) (soundtrack only)
 Crazy Rich Asians (2018) (soundtrack only)

References

External links

1933 births
Living people
Hong Kong film actresses
Singers from Nanjing
People from Shanghai
Actresses from Nanjing
20th-century Chinese actresses
20th-century Chinese women singers
Pathé Records (Hong Kong) artists